Fleming Hall is a historic building on the campus of Western New Mexico University in Silver City, New Mexico. It was built in 1917 as a facility to teach Science and Physical Education. It was remodelled as the university museum and alumni hall in 1973. The building was designed in the Mission Revival architectural style by Trost & Trost. It has been listed on the National Register of Historic Places since September 22, 1988.

References

National Register of Historic Places in Grant County, New Mexico
Mission Revival architecture in New Mexico
School buildings completed in 1917
School buildings on the National Register of Historic Places in New Mexico
University museums in New Mexico
Western New Mexico University
1917 establishments in New Mexico